EKS RX is a Swedish auto racing team founded by racing driver Mattias Ekström. The team is competing in FIA World Rallycross Championship since 2014 and entered the team championship in 2015.
 
In January 2017 it was announced that the team would receive full factory support from Audi Sport for the 2017 World Rallycross Championship. The team had previously been run with assistance from Audi Sport's official suppliers.
 
On 29 January 2018, team owner Mattias Ekström announced that he would be leaving the DTM series and concentrating on his World RX team. An announcement two days later confirmed that Andreas Bakkerud would be racing for the team in 2018.

After the 2018 season on December 10, EKS announced that it would end its rallycross factory program due to Audi pulling the funding. The team did however make a return in 2019, now as a privateer, with Hungarian driver Krisztián Szabó. Ekström also competed at Spa-Francorchamps, in a technical partnership with JC Raceteknik.

For the 2020 FIA World Rallycross Championship, Ekström became a full-time driver for KYB Team JC, finishing runner-up with two wins. His teammate Robin Larsson ranked 6th in points. The partnership was strengthened for the 2021 season, so the team was rebranded KYB EKS JC. Also in 2021, the team partnered with Dreyer & Reinbold Racing to compete at Nitro Rallycross.

Racing record

Complete FIA European Rallycross Championship results
(key)

Supercar

Complete FIA World Rallycross Championship results
(key)

Supercar

References

External links

 
 EKS Audi Sport news at The Checkered Flag
 

Swedish auto racing teams
World Rallycross Championship teams
Red Bull sports teams
Auto racing teams established in 2014
World Rally Championship teams